Massimiliano Versace (born December 21, 1972, in Monfalcone, Italy) is the co-founder and the CEO of Neurala Inc, a Boston-based company building Artificial Intelligence emulating brain function in software and used in automating the process of visual inspection in manufacturing. He is also the founding Director of the Boston University Neuromorphics Lab. Massimiliano Versace is a Fulbright scholar and holds two PhD in Experimental Psychology from the University of Trieste, Italy and Cognitive and Neural Systems from Boston University, USA. He obtained his BSc from the University of Trieste, Italy.

Professional life 
Versace grew up in Monfalcone, Italy and came to the United States in 2001 as a Fulbright scholar. He holds a masters in psychology from the University of Trieste and two PhDs (Experimental Psychology, University of Trieste, Italy—Cognitive and Neural Systems, Boston University, USA). As Artificial Intelligence Professor at Boston University, he founded the Neuromorphics Lab, and in 2009-2011 the lab led a main research thrust in the DARPA SyNAPSE in collaboration with Hewlett-Packard designing artificial nervous systems, based on deep learning, implemented on novel  memristor-based devices. In December 2010, Versace published a cover-featured articled on the IEEE Spectrum   describing the roadmap to develop a large scale brain model making use of memristor based technologies.

The model designed by Versace and his colleagues, termed Modular Neural Exploring Traveling Agent (MoNETA) was the first large-scale neural network model to implement whole-brain circuits to power a virtual and robotic agent compatibly with memristor-based hardware computations. A cover page article in IEEE Computer  features the software platform and modeling implemented by the joint HP and Boston University teams, and the March 2012 edition of IEEE Pulse  features his lab work on brain modeling. 
From 2011 to 2016, Versace and his team at Neurala   worked with NASA and successfully built deep learning models able to learn power navigation and perception for exploring novel environments in real-time.

His work has also been featured in TIME Magazines, New York Times, Nasdaq, The Boston Globe, Xconomy, IEEE Spectrum, Fortune, CNBC, The Chicago Tribune, TechCrunch, VentureBeat, Associated Press,  Geek Magazine, and is a TEDx speaker.

In 2006, with two colleagues from Boston University, he co-founded Neurala  Inc. to bring this technology to market in applications ranging from robots, to drones, and other smart devices.

Awards 
Versace is a recipient of the Fulbright Fellowship in 2001. Career and company awards include:

 Gold prize at the Edison Award Best New Product in Social Innovation;
 CB Insights 100 Most Promising AI Companies;
 Draper Venture Network Most Innovative Company;
 Disruptor Daily 100 Most Disruptive Companies,

Versace is also recipient of the CELEST Award for Computational Modeling of Brain and Behavior in 2009, and was awarded top cited article 2008-2010 in Brain Research.

Neural modeling, Deep Learning, and Robotics 
Massimiliano Versace's pioneered research in continual learning  neural networks, in particular applied to cortical models of learning and memory, and how to build intelligent machines equipped with low-power, high density neural chips that implement large-scale brain circuits of increasing complexity. His Synchronous Matching Adaptive Resonance Theory (SMART) model shows spiking laminar cortical circuits self-organize and stably learn relevant information, and how these circuits be embedded in low-power, memristor-based hybrid CMOS chip and used to solve challenging pattern recognition problems. His work has been featured on Fortune, Inc, Tech Crunch, IEEE Spectrum, Venture Beat, among others.

See also 

Physical neural network
Neuromorphic
machine learning

References

External links

 TedX Talk April 2014
 New Scientist August 2011
 The Neuromorphics Lab on CNN July 2011
 Silicon Brains, Thought Leaders, AZoRobotics July 2011
 Il Sole 24, Italian business newspaper March 2011
 The Boston University Neuromorphic Lab working on the DARPA SyNAPSE project to implement neural models on memristor hardware
 A blog with a section dedicated to neuroscience and its applications
 A talk on the progress the Boston University Neuromorphic Lab effort in building the memristor-based MoNETA model
 The IEEE Spectrum cover-page article "MoNETA: A Mind Made from Memristors" featuring the memristor-based neural model,  December 1, 2010
 "How DARPA Is Making a Machine Mind out of Memristors", Popular Science December 3, 2010
 "Neuron-like computer hardware finally gets software", MSNBC December 6, 2010

21st-century Italian scientists
Boston University
Italian cognitive scientists
Living people
1972 births